The ACE Aircraft Falcon Cabin Coupe was a light, low cost aircraft built during the Great Depression.

Design
The Falcon is a two-place, strut-braced high-wing conventional geared aircraft. The fuselage is constructed of welded steel tubing and fabric covering. The engine was a 42 hp two cylinder model made by ACE. A Continental A40 could be purchased for an extra $200.

Specifications

See also

References

1930s United States civil utility aircraft
High-wing aircraft